The PS Knoll Lookout Complex is a fire lookout tower and accompanying cabin located in the Apache-Sitgreaves National Forest. It was constructed in the mid-1930s. The nine-acre site consists of 3 contributing buildings and 1 contributing structure. The buildings are a house, storage shed, and outhouse; the structure is the lookout tower. It was constructed by the Aermotor Windmill Company in 1933.

See also
 
 
 National Register of Historic Places listings in Apache County, Arizona

References

External links

Fire lookout towers on the National Register of Historic Places in Arizona
National Register of Historic Places in Apache County, Arizona
Buildings and structures in Apache County, Arizona
Historic sites in Arizona
1930s establishments in Arizona
Towers completed in the 1930s